Macy's Herald Square (originally named the R. H. Macy and Company Store) is the flagship of Macy's department store, as well as the Macy's, Inc. corporate headquarters, on Herald Square in Manhattan, New York City. The building's , which includes  of retail space, makes it the largest department store in the United States and among the largest in the world.

The Macy's building was completed in 1902 after the store had occupied several previous locations in New York City. The building was added to the National Register of Historic Places and was made a National Historic Landmark in 1978.

History

Previous flagship locations

Macy's was founded by Rowland Hussey Macy, who between 1843 and 1855 opened four retail dry goods stores, including the original Macy's store in downtown Haverhill, Massachusetts, established in 1851 to serve the mill industry employees of the area. They all failed, but he learned from his mistakes. He moved to New York City in 1858 and established a new store named "R.H Macy Dry Goods" at Sixth Avenue on the corner of 14th Street.  On the company's first day of business on October 28, 1858, sales totaled $11.08, equivalent to $ today. From the very beginning, Macy's logo has included a star in one form or another, echoing a red star-shaped tattoo that Macy got as a teenager when he worked on a Nantucket whaling ship.

As the business grew, Macy's expanded into neighboring buildings, opening more department stores, and used publicity devices such as a store Santa Claus, themed exhibits, and illuminated window displays to draw in customers.  The store later moved to 18th Street and Broadway, on the "Ladies' Mile", the elite shopping district of the time, where it remained for nearly forty years.

In 1875, Macy took on two partners, Robert M. Valentine (1850–1879), a nephew; and Abiel T. La Forge (1842–1878) of Wisconsin, who was the husband of a cousin.  Macy died just two years later in 1877 from Bright's disease. La Forge died in 1878 and Valentine died in 1879. Ownership of the company was passed down through the Macy family until 1895, when the company, now called "R. H. Macy & Co.", was acquired by Isidor Straus and his brother Nathan Straus, who had previously held a license to sell china and other goods in the Macy's store.

Move
In 1902, the flagship store moved uptown to Herald Square at 34th Street and Broadway, so far north of the other main dry-goods emporia that it had to offer a steam wagonette to transport customers from 14th Street to 34th Street. Although the Herald Square store initially consisted of just one building, it expanded through new construction, eventually occupying almost the entire block bounded by Seventh Avenue on the west, Broadway on the east, 34th Street on the south and 35th Street on the north, with the exception of a small pre-existing building on the corner of 35th Street and Seventh Avenue and another on the corner of 34th Street and Broadway. Robert H. Smith purchased this latter 5-story building in 1900 for $375,000 with the idea of getting in the way of Macy's becoming the largest store in the world: it is largely supposed that Smith, who was a neighbor of the Macy's store on 14th Street, was acting on behalf of Siegel-Cooper, which had built what they thought was the world's largest store on Sixth Avenue in 1896.  Macy's ignored the tactic, and simply built around the building, which now carries Macy's "shopping bag" sign by lease arrangement. That building earned the name Million Dollar Corner when it was finally sold for a then record $1 million on December 6, 1911.

The original Broadway store was designed in 1901 and 1902 by architects Theodore de Lemos and A. W. Cordes under their architecture firm De Lemos & Cordes, and was erected by the Fuller Construction Company. It has a Palladian facade, but has been updated in many details. Other additions to the west were completed in 1924 and 1928, and the Seventh Avenue building in 1931, all designed by architect Robert D. Kohn, the newer buildings becoming increasingly Art Deco in style. The store boasts several wooden escalators still in operation.

Renovations 

In 2012, Macy's began the first full renovation of the flagship store at a reported cost of $400 million. Studio V Architecture, a New York-based firm, was the overall master plan architect of the project, with Kevin Kennon Architects providing the exterior and entryway designs. The renovations completed in November 2015 but Macy's continues to modify the store to suit changing customer tastes and maximize return on the real estate.

In 2016, the company explored adding one or two towers to the building to house hotel or office space. The next year, it considered turning the structure's roof into a park. Macy's unveiled plans in 2019 to build a  office building atop the existing store. The tower's construction would also include improvements to the nearby area.

Incidents 
In August 2014, Macy's agreed to a $650,000 penalty proposed by the New York Attorney General to settle a number of claims of racial profiling and false detention involving nearly two dozen African-American, Latino and other customers at the Herald Square store who had lodged complaints in February 2013. As part of the deal, the retail group agreed to introduce policies to ensure all customers were treated equally regardless of race or ethnicity.

On June 1–2, 2020, during the George Floyd protests in New York City, 17 people looted Macy's Herald Square as part of a series of looting incidents around Midtown Manhattan. The store had been boarded up on May 31 in advance of the protests, but looters took the boards apart. Though physical damage was limited, The New York Times reported that it was symbolic of Macy's financial troubles, which had resulted after the location was forced to close during the COVID-19 pandemic in New York City.

Events
Macy's is noted for its elaborate animated holiday and Christmas window displays in many of its U.S. stores, but most notably at the Herald Square location.  Each year presents a different theme shown in six windows on the Broadway side of the building. Each window includes animated displays with complex scenery, attracting thousands of viewers.  Since 2012, the windows have been designed, fabricated and animated by Standard Transmission Productions, based in Red Hook, Brooklyn.

In summer 2007, Macy's mounted a public art exhibition at the Herald Square flagship, using its windows to display pieces from fashion designers Misaki Kawai, Anna Sui, and John F. Simon Jr. Art Under Glass was viewable to the public through that year's fashion week.

Other events include:
Macy's Thanksgiving Day Parade: the world's largest parade, it takes place annually on Thanksgiving Day and ends at Macy's Herald Square.
Macy's Santaland: an area with Christmas decorations and toys where children can meet and be photographed with Santa Claus.
Macy's Flower Show: an annual spring event where flowers are coordinated to bloom as they are installed in the store.
Macy's Believe campaign: a fundraiser for the Make-A-Wish Foundation.

Partnerships
Through a partnership with tech retailer b8ta, "The Market @ Macy's" section features pop-up spaces for new brands.

See also

Macy's, Inc., for a history of the company formerly known as Federated Department Stores, owners of Macy's

References
Notes

Further reading
Hungerford, Edward "Early History of Macy's" in The Romance of a Great Store (1922)

External links

Commercial buildings completed in 1902
Commercial buildings on the National Register of Historic Places in Manhattan
Department stores on the National Register of Historic Places
Macy's
Midtown Manhattan
National Historic Landmarks in Manhattan
Tourist attractions in Manhattan
34th Street (Manhattan)